The 1936–37 Divizia B was the third season of the second tier of the Romanian football league system.

The format was changed this year, from 5 series of 8 teams to 2 series of 13 teams. Also it was decided to expand Divizia A and first four teams of both series were promoted.

Team changes

To Divizia B
Promoted
 —
Relegated from Divizia A
 —

From Divizia B
Relegated to Divizia C
 CA Cluj
 Societatea Gimnastică Sibiu
 Prahova Ploiești
 Tricolor Baia Mare
 CA Timișoara
 Patria Diciosânmartin
 CFR Oradea
 Elpis Constanța
 UD Reșița
 CFR Cluj
 Brașovia Brașov
 Stadiul Bacăoan Bacău
 Societatea Sportivă Sibiu

Promoted to Divizia A
 —

League standings

Seria Est

Seria Vest

See also 
 1936–37 Divizia A
 1936–37 Divizia C

References

Liga II seasons
Romania
2